The Irish Guard is a group of uniformed students that leads the Band of the Fighting Irish onto the field at home games. They are considered by some to be one of the integral parts in the pageantry, lore, and legend of Notre Dame football.

History
The Irish Guard was formed in 1949 as a part of the University of Notre Dame Marching Band. The uniform of the guard is based on the pattern of the traditional Scottish kilt and incorporated the unique Notre Dame tartan.  

They accompany the Fighting Irish Marching Band at away games throughout the season, and at all home games at Notre Dame Stadium.  The Irish Guard travels with the Band of the Fighting Irish to away games and marches with the band on campus.  These traditions include the Victory Clog to the tune "Damhsa Bua" performed after every Irish football win..

Requirements
Members of the Irish Guard must demonstrate a refined marching technique, a dedication to university ideals, and, most importantly, stature and poise.

John Fyfe, a native of Glasgow, Scotland, and former employee of the University of Notre Dame, provided members with background and experience as to the proper way to dress, march, and comport themselves in public. Mr. Fyfe taught the Guard to emulate the stoic and silent manner of the British Army's Foot Guards, including that of the Irish Guards.

In 2014, Notre Dame Band Director Dr. Kenneth Dye instituted a policy that limited Irish Guard membership only to students that had previously served for at least one year in the band as an instrumentalist or manager.  This policy change ended the decades-long tradition that allowed any Notre Dame student in good standing to tryout for the Irish Guard.

Notes

References
Seen and heard on campus University of Notre Dame Magazine

Notre Dame Fighting Irish
1949 establishments in Indiana